Iraja may refer to:

One of two saints, Abadir and Iraja, in the Coptic Orthodox Church
Irajá, a neighborhood in the city of Rio de Janeiro, Brazil